Det gælder os alle is a 1949 Danish drama film directed by Alice O'Fredericks.

Cast
Poul Reichhardt as Jørgen Vedel
Lisbeth Movin as Edith
Ib Schønberg as Direktør Lassen
Agnes Rehni as Fru Lassen
Lily Broberg as Karen
Ilselil Larsen as Leni Rosner
Preben Lerdorff Rye as Chauffør Olsen
Preben Mahrt as Kurt
Helga Frier as Grethe
Tom Rindom Thomsen - Hugo
Grete Bendix as Søster Erika
Signi Grenness as Anna
Karen Meyer as Ninas mor
Per Buckhøj
Alma Olander Dam Willumsen as Fru Gormsen
Sigurd Langberg
Bente Hansen as Tove
Wenche Klouman as Gerd

References

External links

1949 films
1940s Danish-language films
1949 drama films
Danish black-and-white films
Films directed by Alice O'Fredericks
Films scored by Sven Gyldmark
Danish drama films